Sir Jonathan Paul Ive  (born 27 February 1967) is a British industrial and product designer, as well as businessman. Ive was the chief design officer (CDO) of Apple Inc. from 1997 until 2019 (known as senior vice principal of industrial design until 2015), and serves as Chancellor of the Royal College of Art.

Ive joined Apple in September 1992, and was promoted to senior vice principal of industrial design in the late 1990s after the return of co-founder Steve Jobs to the company, and CDO in 2015. He left the company in July 2019. Working closely with Jobs during their tenure together at Apple, Ive played a vital role in the designs of the iMac, Power Mac G4 Cube, iPod, iPhone, iPad, MacBook, and parts of the user interface of Apple's mobile operating system iOS, among other products. He also helped design buildings, such as Apple Park and Apple Stores.

Born in London, Ive lived there until his family moved to Stafford when he was 12. He studied design at Newcastle Polytechnic, and was later hired by the London-based start-up design firm Tangerine. After joining Apple, he began designing the decade's PowerBooks and Macs, finally taking up US citizenship in 2012 to become a dual British-American national. He was invited to join the Royal College of Art in May 2017 as its head-of-college, serving a fixed five-year term until May 2022.

Ive has received accolades and honours for his designs and patents. In the United Kingdom, he has been appointed a Royal Designer for Industry (RDI), an Honorary Fellow of the Royal Academy of Engineering (HonFREng), and a Knight Commander of the Order of the British Empire (KBE). In 2018, he was awarded the Professor Hawking Fellowship of the Cambridge Union Society. In a 2004 BBC poll of cultural writers, Ive was ranked the most influential person in British culture. His designs have been described as integral to the successes of Apple, which has gone on to become the world's largest information technology company by revenue and the largest company in the world by market capitalization.

On 27 June 2019, in an interview with the Financial Times, Ive announced he would leave Apple after 27 years to start his own design firm, LoveFrom, together with industrial designer Marc Newson. He was recruited by the Agnelli family to work on Ferrari vehicles, starting in 2021.

Early life and education
Jonathan Paul Ive was born on 27 February 1967 in Chingford, London, United Kingdom. It is stated in multiple sources that Ive was born in Essex but Chingford became part of London in 1965, two years before Ive was born.  As such Ive is often described as speaking with an Essex accent. His father, Michael Ive, was a silversmith who lectured at Middlesex Polytechnic, and his grandfather was an engineer. Raised just outside London, Ive attended the Chingford Foundation School and Walton High School in Stafford where he studied sculpture and chemistry. While attending secondary school, he was diagnosed with dyslexia.

According to a March 2014 interview with Time, "It was his teenage love of cars that made Ive decide to become a designer. When he left school, he checked out a few car-design courses in London, including one at the Royal College. He swiftly changed his mind. 'The classes were full of students making vroom! vroom! noises as they drew,' he recalls, still horrified."

Ive decided to study industrial design at Newcastle Polytechnic instead. There he was exposed to a form of Germanic design which originated at the Bauhaus. The Bauhaus expressed the idea of only including what is needed into designs. This philosophy can be seen in his work with Apple. While at Newcastle, some of his designs – including a telephone and a hearing aid – were exhibited at the Design Museum in London. He graduated with a first class BA in industrial design in 1989.

Ive's designs at polytechnic garnered him the RSA Student Design Award, which afforded him a small stipend and a travel expense account to use on a trip to the United States. He travelled to Palo Alto, California, where he met various design experts including Robert Brunner – a designer who ran a small consultancy firm that would later join Apple Computer. After returning to England six weeks later, Ive interned at product design agency Roberts Weaver Group (his college sponsor) where he impressed executives with a pronounced attention to detail and work ethic.

Career

Tangerine 
After a year with Roberts Weaver, Ive joined the industrials group at a London startup design agency called Tangerine, located in Hoxton Square. He designed a diverse array of products, such as microwave ovens, toilets, drills and toothbrushes. However, he became frustrated after he designed a toilet, bidet, and sink for client Ideal Standard, and the company's boss rejected the work, stating that the products were too costly and looked too modern. Ive was unhappy working for clients whom he disliked and who had different ideas. From 1990 to 1992, Brunner tried to recruit Ive to Apple. During this time, Apple became a client of Tangerine, with Ive spearheading the firm's initial PowerBook designs.

Apple 

He was formally recruited to Apple as a full-time employee in September 1992. Ive was initially apprehensive about leaving Tangerine for Apple as he thought the move from Britain to California would take a toll on his family. His first major assignment in Apple's industrial design group regarded the second generation of the Newton and the MessagePad 110. Initial design failures and lack of commercial success during the early 1990s, prompted Ive to consider quitting. Steve Jobs, who left in 1985 after being pushed away by John Sculley, was staging a return to the company and recruited Ive to join him in taking the firm in a different direction. Jon Rubinstein, Ive's boss at the time, managed to retain Ive as an employee by explaining that Apple was "going to make history" under Jobs in 1996.

Ive became the senior vice president of industrial design in 1997 and subsequently headed the industrial design team responsible for most of the company's significant hardware products. Ive's first assignment in this capacity was the iMac, introduced in 1998 (he is credited with designing its translucent plastic case). The iMac helped pave the way for many other designs such as the iPod and eventually the iPhone and the iPad. Ive described his rapport  with Jobs in 2014: "When we were looking at objects, what our eyes physically saw and what we came to perceive were exactly the same. And we would ask the same questions, have the same curiosity about things." Ive became the first human to make a public phone call with Jobs after he introduced the iPhone on January 9, 2007. Ive's desire for keeping the products as thin as possible may have led to the mechanically fragile butterfly keyboard and removing the Magsafe power connector, HDMI port, and SD Card reader from the MacBook.

Ive was given his own design office at Apple during the early 2000s in which he oversaw the work of his appointed design team, and he was the only Apple designer with a private office. Only his core team—which consisted of around 15 people from the UK, the US, Japan, Australia, and New Zealand (who had worked together for around two decades)—and top Apple executives were allowed into the office, because it contained all of the concepts, including prototypes, that the design team was working on. Ive also refused to allow his children or family members to enter the office. During the early 2010s, Jobs declared that Ive "has more operational power than anyone else at Apple except me". The offices of Jobs and Ive in Apple's Cupertino headquarters were linked through a hidden corridor with single-access doors. In 2011 it was reported that Ive was paid $30 million in base salary with a $25 million stock bonus for the year. His compensation ceased to be publicly disclosed by the firm thereafter, rendering him the only Apple executive to be afforded such as provision. A year later it was estimated that his net worth was £80 million.

On 29 October 2012, Apple announced that Ive would "provide leadership and direction for Human Interface (HI) across the company in addition to his role as the leader of Industrial Design." With the 2013 World Wide Developers Conference (WWDC) announcement of iOS 7 and Ive's role as principal, Apple press information was also updated to reflect his new title: senior vice president of design. In the same press update, Ive stated that he hoped his best work was yet to emerge and that he preferred to be identified as a maker of products, rather than a designer. On 26 May 2015, the firm announced that Ive was promoted to chief design officer (CDO), at the time one of only three C-level executives at Apple along with CEO Tim Cook and CFO Luca Maestri (Jeff Williams would be promoted to COO at the end of 2015). On 8 December 2017, Apple announced that Ive would resume direct responsibility for the company's product design after spending the preceding two years in a more executive, non-creative role.

After Ive’s departure from Apple in June 2019, he designed some watchOS 7 watch faces. Apple also confirmed that he worked on the M1 iMac (2021) which had a color palette that was a throwback to the G3 iMac (1998), which Ive designed.

LoveFrom
Apple announced on 27 June 2019 that Ive would depart the company, stating that he would start an independent firm named LoveFrom, along with fellow Apple industrial designer Marc Newson, that would work with Apple as its primary client. LoveFrom is known to keep a low profile, and does not disclose information about its employees. LoveFrom unveiled a minimalistic website in October 2021. In July 2022, Apple ended its consulting agreement with Ive, thus ending Ive's relationship with the company.

Royal College of Art 
Ive received an honorary degree from the Royal College of Art (RCA) in 2009.

On 25 May 2017, Ive was appointed Chancellor of the RCA in London, effective 1 July 2017, succeeding Sir James Dyson. In this position he serves a fixed five-year term as the Head of college, where he will govern the college as an academic administrator. Ive began running committee meetings, attending faculty meetings, and conferring degrees in the summer of 2017.

Ive said of the appointment: "I am thrilled to formalise my relationship with the RCA, given the profound influence the college has had on so many of the artists and designers that I admire."

Ive was still chancellor in January 2023.

Public image 

Ive is widely known for his minimalist, downplayed sense of style and presentation of self. Chief among his public image is his "nearly shaved head and tightly trimmed beard". It is estimated that Ive first shaved his head in a tight buzzcut and coupled it with stubble when, in 2001, aged 34, he was promoted to vice president of industrial design at Apple. His look had him referred to as one of the "100 Most Powerful Bald Men in the World" by GQ in their 2013 listing. Known for its minimalist look, it has inspired Halloween costumes, grooming regimens, and a small-scale fashion movement, among other things.

He has been known to sport "signature looks" that include: multi-colored pied-de-poule suits, painter's pants, canvas pants, linen button down shirts, Clarks Wallabees, and mono-colored t-shirts. His favorite tailor is reportedly British clothier Thomas Mahon.

Ive's voice, used in Apple's marketing and promotional videos since 1994, has been noted for its Essex accent and reserved, loquacious style of speech.

Influences 
The work and principles of Dieter Rams, the chief designer at Braun from 1961 until 1995, influenced Ive's work. In Gary Hustwit's documentary film Objectified (2009), Rams says that Apple is one of only a handful of companies existing today that design products according to his ten principles of good design.

He is also said to have been influenced by the Bauhaus tradition (known for its credos form follows function and less is more), which emerged in Germany during the 1920s and became a staple design approach adopted by the Ulm School of Design during the 1950s. The Bauhaus / Ulm design style was also adopted during the 1980s by luxury automotive brand Audi, which also influenced Jonathan Ive's designs (particularly his work with Apple), and has garnered comparisons in color stencil, structure, and lighting design.

Personal life 
While he was attending secondary school at Walton High School in Stafford he met his future wife, British writer and historian Heather Pegg Ive in 1987. He and Pegg have two sons. His family resides in the Pacific Heights neighbourhood of San Francisco, California. Their home was purchased for US$17 million in 2012. While at Apple, Ive commuted an hour and a half from San Francisco to Cupertino every day. He said in 2014 that if his work at Apple ever became substandard, he would "make things for [himself], for [his] friends at home instead".

According to the Sunday Times Rich List in 2019, Ive was worth an estimated £192 million.

Known to live a reserved, private home life, he shuns publicity.

Automobiles 
Since his early years in England, Ive has expressed an interest in automobiles and automotive design. While in university he drove a Fiat 500. He frequently attends auto shows and exhibitions such as the Goodwood Festival of Speed, where he serves as a jury member for competitions.

It has been reported that Ive's preferred carmakers were all once-British: Aston Martin, Bentley, and Land Rover. Ive has been linked to owning: an Aston Martin DB4, Aston Martin DB9, Aston Martin Vanquish, Bentley Brooklands, Bentley Mulsanne, Land Rover LR3, and a Rolls-Royce Silver Cloud.

Charity work and public service

Ive has designed products for charitable causes, including a one-off Leica camera that set a world record auction price and a Jaeger-LeCoultre sports watch — one of only three — for an HIV/AIDS-charity. During this auction, Ive and fellow designer Marc Newson raised $13 million for Bono's Product Red charity. The Bill and Melinda Gates Foundation matched this sum, bringing the total raised to $26 million.

In 2023, Ive redesigned the Red Nose, the symbol of Comic Relief's Red Nose day, sold to raise money for charity. He also designed the emblem for the coronation of Charles III, which features a rose, thistle, daffodil, and shamrock— traditional symbols representing the four parts of the United Kingdom – in the shape of St Edward's Crown. Ive described the choice of these flowers as being "inspired by King Charles's love of the planet, nature, and his deep concern for the natural world," and that it is intended to refer to the "optimism of spring".

Honors and awards

Throughout his career at Tangerine and Apple, Ive has received nominations and garnered awards for his work. In the United Kingdom, he has been appointed a Royal Designer for Industry (RDI), an Honorary Fellow of the Royal Academy of Engineering (HonFREng), a Commander of the Order of the British Empire (CBE) in 2006 and Knight Commander of the same Order (KBE) in 2012. He has received honorary degrees from the Rhode Island School of Design and California College of the Arts, and made an honorary doctor of the Royal College of Art. On successive Wednesdays in June 2016, Ive was awarded honorary doctorates at the University of Cambridge and the University of Oxford. In 2004, he was named the "Most Influential Person on British Culture" in a BBC poll of cultural writers.

See also
 Apple Inc. design motifs
 Apple Industrial Design Group
 List of English inventors and designers

Notes

References

Further reading

External links

 Jonathan Ive at the Royal College of Art 
 Jonathan Ive at BBC News
 Jonathan Ive profile at Businessweek
 RE:WIRED 2021: Designing for the Future We Want to Inhabit, Jony Ive & Anna Wintour in Conversation

1967 births
Alumni of Northumbria University
Apple Inc. executives
British expatriates in the United States
British industrial designers
Knights Commander of the Order of the British Empire
Living people
People with dyslexia
People from Chingford
Product designers
English architects
Royal Designers for Industry